The women's 100 metre freestyle competition of the swimming events at the 1963 Pan American Games took place on April. The last Pan American Games champion was Chris von Saltza of US.

This race consisted of two lengths of the pool, both lengths being in freestyle.

Results
All times are in minutes and seconds.

Heats

Final 
The final was held on April.

References

Swimming at the 1963 Pan American Games
Pan